The 2010 South Carolina gubernatorial election took place on November 2, 2010. Incumbent Republican Governor Mark Sanford was term limited and unable to seek re-election. Primary elections took place on June 8, 2010, and a runoff election, as was necessary on the Republican side, was held two weeks later on June 22.

Republican Nikki Haley defeated Democrat Vincent Sheheen in the general election by a margin of 4.5%. As of 2022, this is the closest that the Democrats have come to winning the governorship of South Carolina since their last victory in 1998. This is the first open-seat election since 1994.

Republican primary
According to CNN, Haley initially entered the gubernatorial primary as a dark horse candidate. In an article covering her surge in the primary in the weeks prior to the election, it was noted that a "surprise" endorsement from former Alaska governor and 2008 vice presidential candidate Sarah Palin boosted Haley's candidacy. Haley's campaign was backed by TV ads run by ReformSC, an advocacy group funded by allies of outgoing governor Mark Sanford.

Candidates
Gresham Barrett, U.S. Congressman
André Bauer, Lieutenant Governor
Nikki Haley, State Representative
Henry McMaster, State Attorney General

Endorsements

Nikki Haley
 Former Governor Mitt Romney (R-MA), former presidential candidate for 2008 Republican nomination
 Former Governor Sarah Palin (R-AK), former Republican vice presidential candidate
 Former First Lady of South Carolina Jenny Sanford
Republican Liberty Caucus

Gresham Barrett
 Former U.S. Vice President Dick Cheney

Henry McMaster
 Former Mayor of New York Rudy Giuliani (R-NY), former presidential candidate for 2008 Republican Nomination
 Senator John McCain (R-AZ), former candidate for 2008 Presidential Election 
 Former Governor David Beasley (R-SC)

André Bauer
 Former Governor Mike Huckabee (R-AR), former presidential candidate for 2008 Republican nomination

Polling

Runoff

Results

Democratic primary

Candidates
Robert Ford, State Senator from Charleston
Jim Rex, State Superintendent of Education from Fairfield County
Vincent Sheheen, State Senator from Camden

Polling

as of March 5, 2010 Dwight Drake withdrew from the race for Governor.

Results

Other Parties
Morgan Reeves, Businessman, Minister, and retired National Football League player from Irmo
 Dr. Reeves was nominated on March 30 by the United Citizens Party and South Carolina Green Party on April 7 (see SC Election Commission website).  Reeves appeared on the November 2nd general election ballot for both parties. An Independent, Dr. Reeves collected enough voter petition signatures to qualify by the July 15th deadline onto a 3rd ballot line.

Jim Rex, State Superintendent of Education from Fairfield County
Rex was nominated by the Working Families Party prior to losing the Democratic primary.  Rex did not appear on the Working Families ballot line in November due to South Carolina's "sore loser" law that requires candidates not to seek nominations from multiple parties from appearing on the ballot after they lose any one party's nomination (see candidate party pledge forms).  Several election law issues are before US appellate court in Richmond, Virginia regarding conformity to the 1965 Voting Rights Act and US Constitutional provisions, see ACLU/Platt v SC

General election

Debates
"First in the State" Republican Gubernatorial Primary Debate
Sponsored by the Republican Parties of Newberry and Laurens Counties
Aired on WIS-TV on September 22, 2009 
Watch here

"Spotlight on the Candidates" Joint Gubernatorial Primary Debate
Sponsored by the SC Natural Resources Society
Aired on SCETV on November 3, 2009 
(This debate marked the first time in state history that gubernatorial primary candidates from both parties participated in the same debate.)
Watch here

SCGOP Gubernatorial Debate
Sponsored by the South Carolina Republican Party
Moderated by MSNBC hosts Joe Scarborough and Mika Brzezinski
Aired on WCSC-TV on January 28, 2010 
Watch here
Republican Candidates For South Carolina Governor April Debate: Watch here

Endorsements
Senator Vincent Sheheen -- South Carolina Chamber of Commerce

Representative Nikki Haley-- National Rifle Association

Representative Nikki Haley-- South Citizens for Life

Predictions

Polling

Results

References

External links
South Carolina State Election Commission
South Carolina Governor Candidates at Project Vote Smart
Campaign contributions for 2010 South Carolina Governor from Follow the Money
South Carolina Governor 2010 from OurCampaigns.com
2010 South Carolina Governor General Election: Nikki Haley (R) vs Vincent Sheheen (D) graph of multiple polls from Pollster.com
Election 2010: South Carolina Governor from Rasmussen Reports
2010 South Carolina Governor from Real Clear Politics
2010 South Carolina Governor's Race from CQ Politics
Race Profile in The New York Times
Debates
South Carolina Republican Gubernatorial Primary Debate on C-SPAN, June 1, 2010
South Carolina Democratic Gubernatorial Primary Debate on C-SPAN, June 3, 2010
South Carolina Republican Gubernatorial Primary Runoff Debate on C-SPAN, June 17, 2010
Official campaign websites
 Gresham Barrett for Governor
 André Bauer for Governor
 Dwight Drake for Governor
 Robert Ford for Governor
 Nikki Haley for Governor
 Henry McMaster for Governor
 Morgan Reeves for Governor
 Jim Rex for Governor
 Vincent Sheheen for Governor

Gubernatorial
2010
2010 United States gubernatorial elections
Nikki Haley

fr:Élections de 2010 en Caroline du Sud